Dobro jutro, to sam ja (trans. Good Morning, It's Me) is the thirteenth studio album from Serbian and former Yugoslav rock band Galija, released in 2005.

Track listing
All the songs were written by Nenad Milosavljević (music) and Predrag Milosavljević (lyrics).
"Čujem te kako lepo dišeš" – 5:58
"Ona je moja" – 5:35
"Ti možeš sve" – 5:33
"To nisi ti" – 3:49
"Možda sam lud" - 6:15
"Promenilo se sve" – 4:47
"Kaži mi" – 5:30
"Vera" – 6:26

Bonus tracks
"Tvoj heroj ostaće mlad" – 5:46
"Prava reč je dovoljna" – 5:49

Personnel
Nenad Milosavljević - vocals
Predrag Milosavljević - vocals
Dragutin Jakovljević - guitar
Slaviša Pavlović - bass guitar

Guest musicians
Laza Ristovski - keyboards
Jan Vrba - keyboards
Aleksandra Kovač - backing vocals
Kristina Kovač - backing vocals

References

 EX YU ROCK enciklopedija 1960-2006,  Janjatović Petar;  

Galija albums
2005 albums
PGP-RTS albums